Charles Brown (March 12, 1867 – June 7, 1937) was an American roque player who competed in the 1904 Summer Olympics. In 1904 he won the bronze medal in the Olympic roque tournament.

References

1867 births
1937 deaths
American roque players
Olympic roque players of the United States
Roque players at the 1904 Summer Olympics
Olympic bronze medalists for the United States
Medalists at the 1904 Summer Olympics